Cross Mountain may refer to:

Cross Mountain (California), near Little Dixie, California
Cross Mountain (Colorado), a mountain peak of Colorado
Cross Mountain (Montana), a mountain in Lincoln County, Montana
Cross Mountain (Delaware County, New York)
Cross Mountain (Hamilton County, New York)
Cross Mountain (Ulster County, New York)
Cross Mountain (Pennsylvania)
Cross Mountain (Tennessee), site of the Cross Mountain Mine disaster
Cross Mountain, Texas